Stephanie Louise Pfirman is a professor at Arizona State University known for her work on sea ice, pollutants in sea ice, and how sea ice is changing over time. She is a fellow of the American Association for the Advancement of Science.

Education and career 
Pfirman graduated from Roy C. Ketcham High School in New York and then received her B.A. from Colgate University in 1978. Following colleges she worked at the United States Geological Survey. She then earned her Ph.D. from Woods Hole Oceanographic Institution and Massachusetts Institute of Technology in 1985. Following her Ph.D. she worked at GEOMAR Helmholtz Centre for Ocean Research Kiel and then the Environmental Defense Fund where she was scientific coordinator for an exhibition on global warming that was presented at the American Museum of Natural History from May 1992 until January 1993. In 1993 she moved to Barnard College where she ultimately held the position of Alena Wels Hirschorn '58 and Martin Hirschorn Professor of Environmental and Applied Sciences. In 2018 she move to Arizona State University where, as of 2022, she is a professor.

Research 
Pfirman is known for her research on Arctic sea ice and the impact of global warming. Her early research examined glacial melting, sediment on Arctic ice, and transport of pollutants by sea ice.  She has used her research on the movement of ice packs in the Arctic to consider how the voyages of Fridtjof Nansen and Ernest Shackleton may have been different if ice floes took a different path through the Arctic. Pfirman has examined decreases in sea ice in the Arctic, and developed games to teach people about global warming. Beyond academic research, Pfirman has examined how women make the decision to conduct Interdisciplinary research, and suggested and co-chaired the River Summer program that brought teachers to do hands-on studies of the Hudson River.

Selected publications

Awards and honors 
In 2009 Phirman was elected to the American Association for the Advancement of Science.

References 

Year of birth missing (living people)
Living people
Colgate University alumni
Massachusetts Institute of Technology alumni
Barnard College faculty
Arizona State University faculty
Women oceanographers
Women earth scientists
Women climatologists
Fellows of the American Association for the Advancement of Science
United States Geological Survey personnel
Arctic scientists
Roy C. Ketcham High School alumni